Marion Township may refer to the following places in the U.S. state of Illinois:

 Marion Township, Lee County, Illinois
 Marion Township, Ogle County, Illinois

See also
Marion Township (disambiguation)

Illinois township disambiguation pages